Zombie Massacre (UK DVD title: Apocalypse Z) is a 2013 horror film written and directed by Luca Boni and Marco Ristori. Uwe Boll  served as producer and acted within the film in the role of President of the United States. The film stars ex-bodybuilder Christian Boeving, Mike Mitchell, and Tara Cardinal, and is an adaptation of the Wii video game of the same name, developed by 1988 Games. The film had its UK DVD release on July 1, 2013. The sequel, Zombie Massacre 2: Reich of the Dead, was released in 2015.

Plot
As the U.S. government begins experimenting with a bacteriological weapon in a small town in Eastern Europe, a disaster occurs in which the weapon spreads its effects on the citizens of the area, turning them into mutated zombies. To cover up the exposure and make it look like a nuclear meltdown of an area power station, the U.S. President orders a team of contracted mercenaries to be sent in to wipe out the zombie plague and secure the "accident" while facing off with the zombie horde.

Cast
 Christian Boeving as Jack Stone
 Mike Mitchell as John 'Mad Dog' McKellen
 Tara Cardinal as Eden Shizuka
 Jon Campling as Doug Mulligan
 Carl Wharton as General Carter
 Daniel Vivian as Dragan Ilic
 Nathalia Henao as Claire Howard
 Gerry Shanahan as Doctor Neumann
 Ivy Corbin as Sam Neumann
 Michael Segal as First Victim / Ultimate creature
 Uwe Boll as President of the US

Production

In 2007, plans for the film and Wii video game were first announced. In 2011, it was announced that Boni and Ristori were attached to direct, with filming expected to take place the following year. In October 2012, a trailer for Apocalypse Z was released.

Release
Zombie Massacre was released on Blu-ray on August 29, 2013, but according to The Numbers both DVD and Blu-ray haven't been released until November 2013.

Reception
HorrorNews.net gave the film a rating of C−, stating that while the film was "overall [awful]", the directing and makeup effects were a highlight.

Sequel
A sequel, Zombie Massacre 2: Reich of the Dead, also directed by Luca Boni and Marco Ristori was released in 2015.

See also
 Nazi zombie films

References

External links
 
 

2010s horror drama films
Italian independent films
Canadian zombie films
American independent films
German independent films
Canadian independent films
2013 independent films
American zombie films
American horror drama films
Nazi zombie films
English-language Canadian films
English-language German films
English-language Italian films
2010s English-language films
2010s Canadian films
2010s American films